Ekweeconfractus ("broken fox") is a genus of teratodontine hyaenodont known from  deposits at the Moruorot site in Kenya.

The genus contains only a single known species, Ekweeconfractus amorui. The full scientific name of type species translates as "broken fox of stone". The researchers who described and named the fossil were able to conduct a CT scan of the cranial cavity, revealing that the animal had a comparatively large neocortex for the overall size of its brain, and an estimated encephalisation quotient of 0.54, similar to that of other contemporary African hyaenodonts, but lower than that of Hyaenodon.

Phylogeny
The phylogenetic relationships of genus Ekweeconfractus are shown in the following cladogram:

See also
 Mammal classification
 Teratodontidae

References

Hyaenodonts
Cenozoic mammals of Africa